32 Persei is a single star located 149 light years away from the Sun in the northern constellation of Perseus. It has the Bayer designation of l Persei, while 32 Persei is the Flamsteed designation. This object is visible to the naked eye as a faint, white-hued star with an apparent visual magnitude of 4.96. It is moving closer to the Earth with a heliocentric radial velocity of −9 km/s, and is a member of the Sirius supercluster: a stream of stars that share a common motion through space.

This is an ordinary A-type main-sequence star with a stellar classification of A3V. It is around 125 million years old with a high rate of spin, showing a projected rotational velocity of 144 km/s. The star has double the mass of the Sun and 1.8 times the Sun's radius. It is radiating 21 times the luminosity of the Sun from its photosphere at an effective temperature of 8,872 K.

References

A-type main-sequence stars
Suspected variables

Perseus (constellation)
Persei, l
BD+42 750
Persei, 32
020677
015648
1002